Peter Bradford Benchley (May 8, 1940 – February 11, 2006) was an American author, screenwriter, and ocean activist. He is known for his bestselling novel Jaws and co-wrote its film adaptation with Carl Gottlieb. Several more of his works were also adapted for both cinema and television, including The Deep, The Island, Beast, and White Shark.

Later in life, Benchley expressed some regret for his tone in writing about sharks, which he felt indulged already present fear and false belief about sharks, and he became an advocate for marine conservation.  Contrary to widespread rumor, Benchley did not believe that his writings contributed to shark depopulation, nor is there evidence that Jaws or any of his works did so.

Early life 
Benchley was the son of Marjorie (née Bradford) and author Nathaniel Benchley and grandson of Algonquin Round Table founder Robert Benchley. His younger brother, Nat Benchley, is a writer and actor. Peter Benchley was an alumnus of the Allen-Stevenson School, Phillips Exeter Academy and Harvard University.

After graduating from college in 1961, Benchley travelled around the world for a year. The experience was told in his first book, a travel memoir titled Time and a Ticket, published by Houghton Mifflin in 1964. Following his return to America, Benchley spent six months reserve duty in the Marine Corps, and then became a reporter for The Washington Post. While dining at an inn in Nantucket, Benchley met Winifred "Wendy" Wesson, whom he dated and then married the following year, 1964. By then Benchley was in New York, working as television editor for Newsweek. In 1967 he became a speechwriter in the White House for President Lyndon B. Johnson, and saw the birth of his daughter Tracy.

Once Johnson's term ended in 1969, the Benchleys moved out of Washington, and lived in various houses, including an island off Stonington, Connecticut where son Clayton was born in 1969. Benchley wanted to be near New York, and the family eventually got a house at Pennington, New Jersey in 1970. Since his home had no space for an office, Benchley rented a room above a furnace supply company.

Jaws 
By 1971, Benchley was doing various freelance jobs in his struggle to support his wife and children. During this period, when Benchley would later declare he was "making one final attempt to stay alive as a writer", his literary agent arranged meetings with publishers. Benchley would frequently pitch two ideas, a non-fiction book about pirates, and a novel depicting a man-eating shark terrorizing a community. This idea had been developed by Benchley since he had read a news report of a fisherman catching a  great white shark off the coast of Long Island in 1964. The shark novel eventually attracted Doubleday editor Thomas Congdon, who offered Benchley an advance of $1,000 leading to the novelist submitting the first 100 pages. Much of the work had to be rewritten as the publisher was not happy with the initial tone. Benchley worked by winter in his Pennington office, and in the summer in a converted chicken coop in the Wessons' farm in Stonington. The idea was inspired by the several great white sharks caught in the 1960s off Long Island and Block Island by the Montauk charterboat captain Frank Mundus.

Jaws was published in 1974 and became a great success, staying on the bestseller list for 44 weeks. Steven Spielberg, who would direct the film version of  Jaws,  has said that he initially found many of the characters unsympathetic and wanted the shark to win. Book critics such as Michael A. Rogers of Rolling Stone shared the sentiment but the book struck a chord with readers.

Benchley co-wrote the screenplay with Carl Gottlieb (along with the uncredited Howard Sackler and John Milius, who provided the first draft of a monologue about the USS Indianapolis) for the Spielberg film released in 1975. Benchley made a cameo appearance as a news reporter on the beach. The film, starring Roy Scheider, Robert Shaw, and Richard Dreyfuss, was released in the summer season, traditionally considered to be the graveyard season for films. However, Universal Studios decided to break tradition by releasing the film with extensive television advertising.  It eventually grossed over $470 million worldwide. George Lucas used a similar strategy in 1977 for Star Wars which broke the box office records set by Jaws, and hence the summer blockbuster was born.

Benchley estimated that he earned enough from book sales, film rights and magazine/book club syndication to be able to work independently as a film writer for ten years.

Subsequent career 
His second novel, The Deep, published in 1976, emerged after Benchley's chance meeting in Bermuda with diver Teddy Tucker while writing a story for National Geographic. Benchley visited the wreck of the Constellation which he described as having sunk on top of two other wrecks the Montana and the Lartington. This gave Benchley the idea of a honeymooning couple discovering two sunken treasures on the Bermuda reefs —  17th century Spanish gold and a fortune in World War II-era morphine — and who are subsequently targeted by a drug syndicate. Benchley co-wrote the screenplay for the 1977 film release, along with Tracy Keenan Wynn and an uncredited Tom Mankiewicz. Directed by Peter Yates and starring Robert Shaw, Nick Nolte and Jacqueline Bisset, The Deep was a box office success, and one of the top 10 highest-grossing films in the US in 1977, though its box office tally fell well short of Jaws. However, the film inspired a number of technical firsts and was a Best Sound nominee at the 1978 Oscars. 

The Island, published in 1979, was a story of descendants of 17th-century pirates who terrorize pleasure craft in the Caribbean, leading to the Bermuda Triangle mystery. Benchley again wrote the screenplay for the film adaptation. But the film version of The Island, starring Michael Caine and co-starring David Warner, failed at the box office when released in 1980.

During the 1980s, Benchley wrote three novels that did not sell as well as his previous works. However, among them was Girl of the Sea of Cortez, a fable influenced by John Steinbeck's The Log from the Sea of Cortez. Benchley's novel about a girl's complicated relationship with the sea, was his best-reviewed book and has attracted a considerable cult following since its publication. Sea of Cortez signposted Benchley's growing interest in ecological issues and anticipated his future role as an impassioned advocate of the importance of protecting the marine environment. Q Clearance, published in 1986, was written from his experience as a staffer in the Johnson White House. Rummies (also known as Lush), which appeared in 1989, is a semi-autobiographical work, loosely inspired by the Benchley family's history of alcohol abuse. While the first half of the novel is a relatively straightforward account of a suburbanite's descent into alcoholic hell, the second part, which takes place at a New Mexico substance abuse clinic, is written as a thriller.

He returned to nautical themes in 1991's Beast written about a giant squid threatening Bermuda. Beast was brought to the small screen as a made-for-television film in 1996, under the title The Beast. His next novel, White Shark, was published in 1994. The story of a Nazi-created genetically engineered shark/human hybrid, it failed to achieve popular or critical success. It was also turned into a made-for-television film titled Creature, with Christopher Lehmann-Haupt of the New York Times saying it "looks more like Arnold Schwarzenegger than any fish". Also in 1994, Benchley became the first person to host Discovery Channel's Shark Week.

In 1999, the television show Peter Benchley's Amazon was created, about a group of plane crash survivors in the middle of a vast jungle.

In the last decade of his career, Benchley wrote non-fiction works about the sea and about sharks advocating their conservation. Among these was his book entitled Shark Trouble, which illustrated how hype and news sensationalism can help undermine the public's need to understand marine ecosystems and the potential negative consequences as humans interact with it. This work, which had editions in 2001 and 2003, was written to help a post-Jaws public to more fully understand "the sea in all its beauty, mystery and power."  It details the ways in which man seems to have become more of an aggressor in his relationship with sharks, acting out of ignorance and greed as several of the species become increasingly threatened by overfishing.

Benchley was a member of the National Council of Environmental Defense and a spokesman for its Oceans Program: "[T]he shark in an updated Jaws could not be the villain; it would have to be written as the victim; for, worldwide, sharks are much more the oppressed than the oppressors."

He was also one of the founding board members of the Bermuda Underwater Exploration Institute (BUEI).

Benchley died of pulmonary fibrosis in 2006.

Legacy
In light of Peter Benchley's lifelong record of shark conservation and educating the public about sharks, the Peter Benchley Ocean Awards have been instituted by Wendy Benchley and David Helvarg as his legacy.

In 2015, researchers confirmed a new species of lanternshark had been found off the Pacific coast of South America, naming it Etmopterus benchleyi. Lead researcher Vicki Vásquez noted the author's work in promoting ocean conservation, particularly sharks, as motivation.

Works

Fiction 
 Jaws (1974)
 The Deep (1976)
 The Island (1979)
 The Girl of the Sea of Cortez (1982)
 Q Clearance (1986)
 Rummies (1989)
 Beast (1991)
 White Shark (1994; republished as Creature in 1997)

Non-fiction 
 Time and a Ticket (1964)
 Life's Tempo on Nantucket (1970)
 Ocean Planet: Writings and Images of the Sea (1994) 
 Shark Trouble: True Stories About Sharks and the Sea (2001) 
 Shark!: True Stories and Lessons from the Deep (2002)
 Shark Life: True Stories About Sharks and the Sea (with Karen Wojtyla) (2005)

Film 
 Jaws, 1975 film adaptation; actor: Interviewer.
 The Deep, 1977 film adaptation; actor: Mate (uncredited)
 Jaws 2, based on characters from Jaws
 The Island, 1980 film adaptation
 Jaws 3-D (a.k.a. Jaws 3), based on characters from Jaws
 Jaws: The Revenge, a fourth film based on characters from Jaws
 Dolphin Cove, 1989 TV series
 The Beast, 1996 television film adaptation
 Creature, 1998 television film adaptation
 Amazon, 1999 TV series
 Mrs. Parker and the Vicious Circle, 1994; actor: Frank Crowninshield

See also 

 Jersey Shore shark attacks of 1916
 Publishers Weekly lists of bestselling novels in the United States

References

External links 
 
 Peter Benchley at the Shark Research Institute
 The Peter Benchley Shark Conservation Awards
 Shark Alliance

 
 Peter Benchley: Rapture of The Deep
 Peter Benchley: Shark Conservationist (LA Times)

1940 births
2006 deaths
American nature writers
20th-century American novelists
20th-century American male writers
Harvard University alumni
Jaws (franchise)
Writers from New York City
United States Marine Corps reservists
People from Pennington, New Jersey
People from Stonington, Connecticut
Phillips Exeter Academy alumni
American male screenwriters
American male novelists
Deaths from pulmonary fibrosis
Novelists from New York (state)
20th-century American non-fiction writers
American male non-fiction writers
Screenwriters from New York (state)
Screenwriters from New Jersey
Screenwriters from Connecticut
20th-century American screenwriters
Maritime writers